Sant'Onofrio  is a frazione  in the Province of Chieti, in the Abruzzo region of Italy.

References

Frazioni of the Province of Chieti